was a Japanese mathematician at the Research Institute for Mathematical Sciences who worked on automorphic forms. He introduced the base change lifting and the Saito–Kurokawa lift.

References

RIMS faculty

20th-century Japanese mathematicians
2010 deaths
21st-century Japanese mathematicians